Siento may refer to:
 Siento (Yolandita Monge album)
 Siento (Miguel de la Bastide album)
 Siento (Sasha Sokol album)